Quercus chapmanii, commonly referred to as the Chapman oak, is a species of oak that grows in the southeastern United States.

Description
Quercus chapmanii is a shrub or small tree occasionally reaching a height of 6 meters (20 feet) but usually less. Leaves sometimes have no lobes, sometimes wavy rounded lobes.

Distribution
Quercus chapmanii is found in the states of Alabama, Florida, Georgia, and South Carolina.

References

External links
 photo of herbarium specimen at Missouri Botanical Garden, collected in Florida circa 1860
 Maps Educational Technology Clearinghouse, Produced by the Florida Center for Instructional Technology, Map showing distribution in Florida (with parts of Alabama and Georgia)
 Pollen Library

chapmanii
Trees of the Southeastern United States
Flora of Florida
Plants described in 1860